Neusticemys is an extinct genus of thalassochelydian sea turtle. Its type species is Eurysternum neuquinum. It is known from the Late Jurassic (Tithonian) aged Vaca Muerta of Patagonia, Argentina

Neusticemys was originally described as a new species of Eurysternum, but was later assigned to its own genus in 1993.

References

Thalassochelydia
Prehistoric turtle genera
Tithonian genera
Late Jurassic turtles
Late Jurassic reptiles of South America
Jurassic Argentina
Fossils of Argentina
Neuquén Basin
Fossil taxa described in 1993